The Circuito Ascari resort is a private motorsports club for automotive enthusiasts and manufacturers with a  long motor racing circuit near Ronda, a city in the Spanish Province of Málaga. In 2022, Zwart sold the facility to two companies in Switzerland and Argentina.

History

After making his fortune in the oil industry, Zwart participated in various racing events, including the British GT where he finished third in 1995 and EuroBOSS, where he was champion in 2003, 2006, and 2007; he purchased the Ascari Cars marque in 1999 and began considering where he and others could drive their supercars safely away from road traffic, which led him to purchase land near Ronda, in the southern part of Spain. Construction of the track began in 2000, and Zwart designed the track to conform with the existing contours of the site. It was completed in 2003. Final cost was estimated at  million. The site was formerly used as a sheep farm.

After building the track, Zwart opened up membership to 500 wealthy motorsports enthusiasts, including Martin Brundle, Christian Danner, Jay Kay, and Dolph Lundgren. In March 2022, CEO Jesús Gijón confirmed that two companies, one from Switzerland and one from Argentina, had purchased the Ascari site from Zwart. The new owners expressed concern that nearby proposed photovoltaic energy developments could cause "irreparable damage for the landscape and environment in the area".

Design
Because of its location, it is favored by European car manufacturers for product launches.

In addition to the track, the clubhouse features a complete restaurant and pool reminiscent of a Spanish villa.

Many of the full circuit's 26 curves are deliberately reminiscent of famous turns at other tracks around the world. Visitors may choose to rent a car at the track, ranging from race-prepared regular production sports cars to ex-Formula 1 racing machines.

Lap times
Klaas Zwart set the overall record of 1:38.46 in an ex-F1 Jaguar R5 (2004) in 2019. Pål Pettersen Berg set the record for roadgoing vehicles in 2020 at 2:14.078 in a Porsche 911 GT2 RS (991.2).

In popular media
Sony Computer Entertainment used Ronda and the Ascari resort to launch their racing video game Gran Turismo 6 in 2013. It is a playable track in the game.

See also
 Bilster Berg, a similar race resort in Germany
 Monticello Motor Club, a race resort in New York (state)

References

External links
 
  (1:38.46)
 

Motorsport venues in Spain
2003 establishments in Spain
Sports venues completed in 2003